Hubballi and Dharwad are twin cities in the Indian state of Karnataka. Hubli-Dharwad form the second-largest municipality of Karnataka in terms of area, after capital and second largest city in Karnataka state. Hubli–Dharwad makes up for the second largest urban agglomeration in the state after capital. The cities have a single municipal corporation called Hubli-Dharwad Municipal Corporation (HDMC).

Hubballi - Dharwad has its contributions for state as well as to nation in both terms, commercial and cultural. Hubballi has the world's longest platform and Dharwad is known as educational hub of Karnataka with other cities such as Udupi, Dakshina Kannada, several others. 

The twin cities are well connected by both Rail & Road. It has the only BRTS (Bus Rapid Transit System) in Karnataka. Hubballi Dharwad BRTS also known as HDBRTS serves the twin cities with a separate corridor along with city roads. Both Hubballi and Dharwad have industrial estates and industrial companies with a number of factories and several services. There are three rail stations between Hubballi & Dharwad, they are Unkal, Amargol, Navalur. The rail line passes through the foot of Nrupatunga Hills, beside Garment industries, etc.

Demographics 
The population of the twin cities as per provisional figures of Census 2011 is 943,788 and is urban. Hubli–Dharwad's population increased by 22.99% between 1981 and 1991, from 527,108 to 648,298, and by 21.2% between 1991 and 2001.

Religion

Hubli–Dharwad has a religiously diverse population. At the time of the 2011 census, over two thirds of the population were Hindus. Over a quarter were Muslim, the largest minority religion. Small minorities of Christians and Jains also live here.

Languages
Kannada is the local language spoken in this city. English is also spoken in the city.

Administration

Hubli - Dharwad municipal corporation 

Hubli–Dharwad Municipal Corporation is municipal corporation for twin cities of Hubli and Dharwad in Karnataka state in India. It was constituted in 1962 by combining two cities separated by a distance of 20 kilometers. The population of the twin cities as per the 2011 census is 943,788 of which 474,518 are males and 469,270 are female. Total literates are 727,103 of which 382,913 are males while 344,190 are female. The average literacy rate of Hubli and Dharwad city is 86.79 percent of which male and female literacy was 91.12 and 82.44. Hubli–Dharwad's population increased 22.99% between 1981 and 1991, from 527,108 to 648,298, and by 21.2% between 1991 and 2001.

Economy

Industrial and business development 
Hubli–Dharwad is a 3rd fastest growing city, & developing industrial hub in Karnataka after state capital, with more than 1000 allied small and medium industries established in Gokul Road and Tarihal regions of Hubli. There are machine tools industries, electrical, steel furniture, food products, rubber and leather industries, and tanning industries.

To promote the overall economic development of industries, institutions and businesses, the Karnataka Chamber of Commerce & Industry was formed. It is one of the premier associations, which has been gaining momentum in achieving potential growth and prosperity in Hubli region. One key aspect of industrialisation for Hubballi-Dharwad was foundation of Agricultural Produce Market Committees (APMCs), which aimed at providing hassle-free market conditions for farmers, to establish regulated and stimulated production of agricultural related commodities and goods.

Transport

Air 

Hubli Airport  is a domestic airport serving the twin cities of Hubli-Dharwad and North Karnataka in the state of Karnataka, India. It is the third busiest airport in Karnataka & the 45th busiest airport in India. In March 2020, Hubli airport received the best airport award under government of India's Regional connectivity scheme. Hubli airport connects to 10 destinations throughout the country. Efforts are being taken to upgrade it to international standards.

Rail 

The city currently has four stations and one Junction. The Hubli Junction railway station is the main railway station in the city with a built-up area of 161460 sq. ft. The other stations are Hubli South, Hubli East, Unkal, and Amargol.  Hubli is the headquarters of the South Western Railway zone. It was carved out as a zone from the current South Central Railway. It is the centre for the Hubli Division. The Hubli Division is one of the highest revenue-generating divisions in India. Hubli is well-connected by the Indian Rail Network. Hubli, an important railway junction, has trains connecting with major cities like Mumbai, New Delhi, Varanasi, Hyderabad, Tirupati, Vijaywada, Kolkata, Chennai Rameshwaram etc  In November 2019, the work for extending a platform was undertaken by the Railways at the estimated cost of 90 Cr. According to railway  officials, the length of the renewed platform is estimated at 1,400 meters, which would be longest in the world. The work is scheduled to be completed by the end of 2020. Hubbali also has a Heritage Rail museum. The Indian Railways currently has 11 railway museums across the country. For bringing glory to the proposed Rail Museum, narrow-gauge Railway Rolling Stocks, from different Railways are being displayed and work is moving at a rapid pace. It is proposed to collect photographs of Rail network going back to the 19th and early 20th century so that all old memories of Rail Journey can be part of the photo gallery in the proposed Rail Heritage Museum.

Road 
Hubli lies on the "Golden Quadrilateral". Asian Highway 47 passes through Hubli. It lies on National Highway 63 (Ankola–Gooty) and National Highway 218 (Hubli–Humnabad), which connect Hubli with major cities in the region. NWKRTC (North West Karnataka Road Transport Corporation) is a state-run corporation headquartered at Hubli. A semi ring road connecting NH4 (Mumbai-Chennai), NH67 (Ankola–Gooty) and NH218 (Hubli–Humnabad) with cloverleaf junction at Gabbur is already under construction.

Hubli-Dharwad Bus Rapid Transit System 

Hubballi-Dharwad BRTS (also known as HDBRTS) is a bus rapid transit system built to serve the twin cities of Hubli and Dharwad, located in the North-Western part of Karnataka state in India. Hubballi-Dharwad BRTS (HDBRTS) project is a Government of Karnataka initiative to foster long-term economic growth in the region. The project promotes fast, safe, comfortable, convenient and affordable public transportation between the twin cities and aims to reduce congestion and air pollution in the region.

The BRTS corridor includes segregated bus lanes, access-controlled bus stations, physical and fare integration with BRT feeder services, off-board ticketing through smart cards and bar-coded paper tickets, intelligent transport system and high-quality buses (Standard AC buses). The corridor is designed for operating regular and express services. It consists of two lanes for BRTS buses on either side of the median bus station facilitating overtaking lanes for express services. Foot overbridges at six locations, PELICAN signals, and synchronised signal management are proposed to facilitate the easy approach of passengers to bus stations.

Education 

Hubli, along with Dharwad, its twin city, is an education centre in Karnataka, housing several educational institutions including one of the sixteen IITs and one of twenty five IIITs:

 Dakshina Bharat Hindi Prachar Sabha, Dharwad set up in 1918, institution was recognised by the Indian Government as one of the Institutes of National Importance in 1964
 KLE Technological University, set up in 1947
 Indian Institute of Information Technology, Dharwad, set up in 2015
 Indian Institute of Technology Dharwad, set up in 2017
 Karnatak University, Dharwad, a major university in Karnataka, set up in 1949
 Karnataka Institute of Medical Sciences, Hubballi, set up in 1957; also houses one of the largest hospitals in India
 Karnataka State Law University, Hubballi; all the law colleges in Karnataka are regulated from here
 KLE Institute of Technology, set up in 2008
 Karnataka Institute for DNA Research
 SDM College of Medical Sciences, set up in 2003
 SDM College of Engineering and Technology, Dharwad set up in 1979
 Sri Dharmasthala Manjunatheshwara College of Dental Sciences, Dharwad set up in 1986
 University of Agricultural Sciences, Dharwad, set up in 1986

Notable people
North Karnataka is known for the Hindustani music. Dharwad district is the place which produced national and international level musicians like Mallikarjun Mansur, Gangubai Hangal, and winner of the Bharat Ratna award, Pandit Bhimsen Joshi.

Award winners
The national level award winners.

Jnanapeeth Award winners
The Jnanpith Award is a literary award in India, it is one of the two most prestigious literary honours in the country.
 D.R. Bendre
Vinayaka Krishna Gokak
 Girish Karnad

Bharat Ratna
 Bhimsen Joshi

Padma Award winners

Padmabhushan
 Gangubai Hangal
 Mallikarjun Mansur
 Basavaraj Rajguru

Padma Vibhushan
 Mallikarjun Mansur

Padmashri Award
 Mallikarjun Mansur
 Vijay Sankeshwar
 Basavaraj Rajguru
 Dr. Mahipati M Joshi
 Dr. R B Patil

President of India's Award for Sanskrit
 V R Panchamukhi

Other notable people

Musicians
 Kumar Gandharva
 Sawai Gandharva
 Venkatesh Kumar

Artists
 Shanta Hublikar
 Leena Chandavarkar
 V.K. Gokak

Writers
 Patil Puttappa
 Narayanacharya
 Sudha Murthy
 G. A. Kulkarni
 C. P. Siddhashrama

Business people
Rai Saheb Ganpatrao Narayanrao Madiman (1879-1947) - Businessman and banker
Gururaj Deshpande - Founder of Sycamore Networks
Vijay Sankeshwar - Founder and owner of VRL Group
Sudha Murthy - co-founder of Infosys
Nandan Nilekani - co-founder of Infosys

References

External links

 
Cities in Karnataka